Krongo, also spelled Korongo or Kurungu and known as Dimodongo, Kadumodi, or Tabanya after local towns, is a Kadu language spoken in the South West of the Nuba Mountains in Kordofan. Fama is a dialect.

Ethnologue lists Angolo, Tabanya, and Toroji in Krongo hills; and Buram, Damaguto, Dar, Dimadragu, and Dimodongo villages.

The speakers themselves refer to the language as “nìinò mó-dì”, meaning “language from home”.

According to research from 1985, Krongo speakers are usually farmers and live off of cultivating crops like sorghum, beans, sesame, peanuts and corn as well as keeping animals like cattle, sheep, pigs, goats and chicken.

A survey from the year 1976 states that other languages spoken in the surveyed region (here referred to as “Krongo” as well) are Arabic, Dinka, Hausa and very small amounts of other African languages. The most common of these is Arabic with 70% of the 443 surveyed people stating to speak the language, although most of them do not speak it as their mother language. It is rather being used as a lingua franca at the market than at home.

According to the survey, there is a high rate of illiteracy among the people in the Krongo region. Many of the younger children don´t know Arabic yet – 90.3% of the people claimed to have learned it after their early childhood. The schools (khalwas) use Arabic as a language of instruction though, which is probably the reason why few of the Krongo people go to school. The majority of the people with a formal education are people who speak Arabic as their mother language and/or men.

The Krongo, like other Nuba, are predominantly Muslim people.

Phonology 
The language of Krongo contains the long and short consonant phonemes and the long and short vowels shown beneath.

short consonant phonemes

long consonant phonemes

short vowel phonemes

long vowel phonemes

Vowels 
The vowels are divided into the two vowel harmony groups +ATR and -ATR. It is unclear what group /e/ belongs in because it is being used to replace either /ɪ/ or the combination of /y/ and /a/, which are similar sounding. The word for “two” for example can either be written /-yáarè/ or /-yáaryà/. Unlike /ɪ/, /e/ can also be used in the same word as [+ATR]-vowels though.
The placement of /o/ and /a/ in the vowel harmony groups is based on the circumstance that /o/ can only be found in the same word with [+ATR]-vowels and /a/ can only be found in the same word with [-ATR]-vowels. They are both also found in words together with only consonants and/or with /e/.

Consonants 
In front of long consonants, only short vowels are used. Glottal stops are being grammatically treated like long consonants. They occur for example in the personal pronouns of the singular: /àˀàŋ/ “I”, /ùˀùŋ/ “you”, /ìˀìŋ/ “he”. The long consonant /ŋŋ/ is used very seldom, for example in the word /àŋŋá/ “we”. /p/ and /pp/ are seldom as well. They occur for example in Arabic loan words.

The consonants /k/, /ŋ/, /s/, /k/, /t/ and /ʈ/ are being palatalized under certain conditions when in front of the vowels /i/ or /ɪ/ or the semi-consonant /y/. That means that their pronunciation shifts from the back of the mouth to the palatal region to a certain degree, depending on the consonant, on whether it´s /y/ or one of the vowels and depending on if it´s an initial consonant or within the word. 

/ŋ/ is being completely palatalized in front of all three letters, so that it becomes the palatal nasal /ɲ/. For example:

For the other mentioned consonants, a complete palatalization is only obligatory in front of /y/. In front of /i/ and /ɪ/ it is optional for the velar plosives as long as it´s within the morpheme interior but in the initial position they cannot be fully palatalized. For /s/ it is always optional. Thus the pronunciation of the word “síkà” could look like this:

[sígà] → not palatalized, or

[sʸígà] → palatal secondary articulation, or

[ʃígà] → complete palataliza\on, change to the palatal frica\ve.

These palatalization patterns apply to the long consonants as well.
From the long consonants, only /ff/ is known to be used at the beginning of words, as in /ffà/ “tree”.

Syntax 
Apart from the subject and the direct object, all nominal phrases are being marked with a case prefix according to the verb.

References

External links 
Krongo basic lexicon at the Global Lexicostatistical Database

Definitely endangered languages
Languages of Sudan
Kadu languages